Neville Frances Bult (27 June 1913 – 30 June 2008), later known by her married name Frances Vorrath, was an Australian freestyle swimmer who competed in the 1932 Summer Olympics. She was an Olympic finalist who finished fifth in the 100 metre freestyle. She also competed in the 400-metre freestyle event and was eliminated in the first round after a third place in her heat.

References

1913 births
2008 deaths
Olympic swimmers of Australia
Swimmers at the 1932 Summer Olympics
Australian female freestyle swimmers
20th-century Australian women